Noreen Margaret Lowry (6 September 1925 – 30 March 2017) was a British barrister and judge at the Old Bailey, where she was the first permanent female judge.

Early life 
Noreen Margaret Collins was born on 6 September 1925 at 82 Adelaide Road in Hampstead, London. Noreen was the eldest daughter of John Edmund Collins (1895–1971), a paint salesman, and Hilda Grace (1901–1984).

Collins was educated at Bedford High School, a private school for girls aged 7 to 18 in Bedford, England. Collins was awarded a place at Lady Margaret Hall, Oxford, but wartime regulations prevented her from taking up the offer. Collins instead read law at the University of Birmingham.

Barrister

Judge

Personal life 
Collins married Edward Lucas Gardner (1912–2001), a barrister and recorder, in 1950. They had a son and also a daughter, the writer Sally Gardner. Noreen's marriage to Gardner was dissolved in 1962. Noreen married Richard John Lowry (1924–2001), a barrister, on 24 April 1963.

References

1925 births
2017 deaths
British women judges
British barristers
People from Hampstead
People educated at Bedford High School, Bedfordshire
Alumni of the University of Birmingham
20th-century English judges